291 is a year.

291 may also refer to:

 291 (number)
 291 (art gallery), an art gallery in Midtown Manhattan, 1905–1917
 291 (magazine), an arts and literary magazine, 1915–1916
 Interstate 291 (Massachusetts), an Interstate highway in Massachusetts
 Interstate 291 (Connecticut), an Interstate highway in Connecticut